Sirjan Airport  is an airport serving Sirjan, in the Kerman Province of Iran.

Airlines and destinations

References

Airports in Iran
Transportation in Kerman Province
Buildings and structures in Kerman Province